Argyra vestita is a species of fly in the family Dolichopodidae. It is distributed in Europe.

References

Diaphorinae
Insects described in 1817
Diptera of Europe
Taxa named by Christian Rudolph Wilhelm Wiedemann